Matthew Forster (1786 – 2 September 1869) was a British Whig politician and merchant.

Forster was elected Whig MP for Berwick-upon-Tweed at the 1841 general election and held the seat until 1853 when he was unseated due to bribery and treating during the 1852 general election. At the ensuing by-election, his son John Forster was elected as a Whig candidate. Forster attempted to regain the seat at the 1857 general election but ranked bottom of the poll.

Forster, "a wealthy and highly respected ship-owner and merchant" had mining interests, as a senior partner in Forster, Smith and Company, in both south County Durham and The Gambia.

In 1840 Richard Robert Madden (the Special Commissioner of Inquiry into the British Settlements on the West Coast of Africa) reported that Forster was one of the London-based merchants who were actively (and illegally) helping the slave traders. However, Forster managed to escape criminal prosecution. In 1841 there was a change of government, and the new government chose not to send the matter to the Queen's Bench, but to a House of Commons committee that Forster himself was part of. Unsurprisingly, this committee rejected most of Madden's findings.

References

External links
 

UK MPs 1841–1847
UK MPs 1847–1852
UK MPs 1852–1857
1786 births
1869 deaths
Whig (British political party) MPs for English constituencies
English businesspeople in shipping
19th-century British businesspeople